Thomas Pritchard (1577–1646) was a Welsh Anglican priest in the first half of the 17th century.

Pratt was born in Glamorgan educated at Hart Hall, Oxford. He was archdeacon of Llandaff from 1626 until his death.

References

Alumni of the University of Oxford
Archdeacons of Llandaff
17th-century Welsh Anglican priests
People from Glamorgan
1577 births
1646 deaths